José Antonio Castro (born 15 October 1955) is an Argentine former footballer who played as a forward. He made five appearances for the Argentina national team in 1979. He was also part of Argentina's squad for the 1979 Copa América tournament.

References

External links
 

1955 births
Living people
Argentine footballers
Footballers from Buenos Aires
Association football forwards
Argentina international footballers
Club Atlético Vélez Sarsfield footballers
Club Atlético Independiente footballers
Argentinos Juniors footballers
Unión de Santa Fe footballers
San Lorenzo de Almagro footballers
Universidad de Chile footballers
Argentine expatriate footballers
Argentine expatriate sportspeople in Chile
Expatriate footballers in Chile